PP-181 Kasur-VIII is a Constituency of Provincial Assembly of Punjab.

General elections 2013

General elections 2008

See also
 PP-180 Kasur-VII
 PP-182 Kasur-IX

References

External links
 Election commission Pakistan's official website
 Awazoday.com check result
 Official Website of Government of Punjab

Constituencies of Punjab, Pakistan